The Roman Catholic Diocese of Timika is a diocese located in the civil districts of Biak-Numfor, Yapen-Waropen, Nabire, Paniai, Puncak Jaya, and Mimika in the Ecclesiastical province of Merauke in Indonesia.

History
 December 19, 2003: Established as Diocese of Timika from the Diocese of Jayapura

Leadership
 Bishops of Timika (Roman rite)
 Bishop John Philip Saklil (December 19, 2003 – August 3, 2019)

References
 GCatholic.org
 Catholic Hierarchy
Diocese of Timika

Roman Catholic dioceses in Indonesia
Christian organizations established in 2003
Roman Catholic dioceses and prelatures established in the 21st century
Timika